Dirk Christian Baltzly (born 1963) is an Australian philosopher and Professor of Philosophy at the University of Tasmania. He is known for his research on ancient Greek and Roman Philosophy. Baltzly is a Fellow of the Australian Academy of Humanities (2008).

Books
Baltzly D, Share M, Hermias: On Plato Phaedrus 227A-245E, Bloomsbury Academic, 2018,  
Baltzly DC, Finamore J, Miles G, Proclus: Commentary on Plato's 'Republic, Cambridge University Press, 2018 
Tarrant H, Layne DA, Baltzly D, Renaud F (eds.), Brill's Companion to the Reception of Plato in Antiquity, Koninklijke Brill NV, 2018 
Baltzly D, Proclus on Time and the Stars, Cambridge University Press, 2013 
 Baltzly D, Proclus: commentary on Plato's Timaeus, part II - Proclus on the world soul, Cambridge University Press, 2009,  
 Baltzly Dirk, Proclus: Commentary on Plato's Timaeus, part III - Proclus on the World's Body, Cambridge University Press, 2007, 
 Tarrant H, Baltzly Dirk (eds.), Reading Plato in Antiquity, Bloomsbury Publishing, 2006, 
 Baltzly Dirk, Blyth D, Tarrant H (eds.), Power and Pleasure, Virtue and Vice: Essays in Ancient Moral Philosophy, University of Auckland, 2001

References

External links
Dirk Baltzly
Dirk Baltzly, Google Scholar

Australian philosophers
Philosophy academics
Living people
Academic staff of the University of Tasmania
1963 births
Scholars of ancient philosophy
Ohio State University alumni
Monash University alumni